Henry Arthur Hew Dalzell, 8th Earl of Carnwath was born 12 April 1858 in Baden-Wurttemberg, the only child of Thomas Henry Dalzell, 7th Earl of Carnwath and Isabella Eliza Wilmot. He succeeded to his father's titles upon the latter's death in 1867. In January 1873, it was reported that fourteen years of age Lord Carnwath was the youngest Earl in Britain. He died 13 March 1873 of measles at Harrow where he was a student. He was succeeded in his titles by his father's younger brother General Arthur Dalzell.

References

The Times, 10 January 1873 and 15 March 1873

1858 births
1873 deaths
Deaths from measles
Earls of Carnwath